Hydriomena ruberata, the  ruddy highflyer, is a moth of the family Geometridae. The species was first described by Christian Friedrich Freyer in 1831. It is found from Ireland and Great Britain east to north-western Russia, and south up to the Alps. It is also present in North America.

The wingspan is 29–37 mm. It is very similar to Hydriomena impluviata. It is "distinguishable from the preceding species [Hydriomena impluviata] by the characters noted above (qv.) and the greater prevalence of reddish or rust-coloured tone. Subbasal line variable, often strongly angled in the cell, sometimes thickened at the angle and again at the hindmargin; antemedian rust-coloured band often ending in a conspicuous black spot at hindmargin;in the distal area the black line on the first radial is generally strong, those on the 5th subcostal second radial rarely so; black apical streak generally conspicuous. The name-type is grey, sharply marked, with the rust colour reduced to 4 narrow, inconspicuous bands. The larva is relatively powerful with a few short bristles, light reddish grey-brown in colour.

There is one generation per year, with adults on wing from mid-May to July.

The larvae feed on Salix species (including S. phylicifolia and S. aurita). Larvae can be found from June to September. It overwinters as a pupa.

References

External links

Lepiforum e.V.

Hydriomena
Moths of Europe
Moths of Asia
Taxa named by Christian Friedrich Freyer
Moths described in 1831